Azela Robinson (born Azela Jacqueline Robinson Cañedo on 26 August 1965 in London, UK) is a Mexican actress of British origin. Famous for her antagonistic interpretations in numerous Mexican telenovelas, among which are Cañaveral de pasiones (1996), Contra viento y marea (2005), Llena de amor (2010) and Yo no creo en los hombres (2014), among many others .

Biography

Early life
Azela Jacqueline Robinson was born in London, UK. Her mother, Nadja Cañedo is Mexican and her father, Alan Robinson is British.

She began her professional training as an actress in 1980 within the Bristol Old Vic Theatre School in Bristol, UK. Eventually, between 1982 and 1983 she took courses at the National Theatre in London.
Looking for opportunities in the entertainment world, she settled in Mexico in the late 1980s.

Films
Once in Mexico, Robinson begins her career as an actress in the movies. She debuted Fin de semana en Garibaldi" (1989), along with Jorge Reynoso. From that time until 1993, Robinson works on approximately 68 films, mainly comedy and action genres. Her increasingly frequent participation in television, causes that gradually she distances herself of the cinema.

In more recent times, her most outstanding performances in the movies are in films such as Espejo retrovisor (2002), with Manuel Ojeda, Contratiempo (2011), with Michel Brown and Tus feromonas me matan (2016), with Alberto Guerra and Julieta Egurrola, among others.

Television
Robinson made her Mexican TV debut in a chapter of the famous horror serie La hora marcada, in 1990. In 1995 she got her first character in a telenovela with the hand of producer Enrique Segoviano in the telenovela Pobre niña rica, with Victoria Ruffo and singer Paulina Rubio. In 1996 she plays Dinorah Faberman, one of the most important and remembered characters of her career, in the telenovela Cañaveral de pasiones, produced by Humberto Zurita and Christian Bach and sharing credit with Daniela Castro, Juan Soler and Angelica Aragón, among others. Thanks to her interpretation, Robinson becomes one of the most outstanding villains of the Mexican telenovelas. As villain she works on melodramas like La usurpadora (1998), Laberintos de pasión (1999) and Mi destino eres tú (2000). In 2001 she interprets the role of Francisca, another of her personages more remembered in the telenovela El manantial, produced by Carla Estrada, next to Adela Noriega, Daniela Romo and Alejandro Tommasi. In 2002 she played one of her few non-antagonistic characters in the telenovela La Otra, produced by Ernesto Alonso. In 2005 she plays Apolonia, another of her most successful antagonistic characters in the telenovela Contra viento y marea, forming a famous dumbbell with actress Beatriz Sheridan. In 2006 participates in the telenovela Mundo de fieras, where again she interprets a non-antagonistic character.

In 2007 she shows another facet of her career as part of the group of conductors of the television program Metropolis. Also participates in the TV series S.O.S.: Sexo y otros Secretos (2007) and Central de Abasto (2008). In 2009 the actress also participates in one of the episodes of the television series Mujeres asesinas, along with the actress María Sorté, as well as another antagonist role in the telenovela Sortilegio.

In 2010, Robinson performs another memorable performance in the telenovela Llena de amor, where she plays Fedra, the main villain of the story. She shares credits with Ariadne Díaz, Valentino Lanús and César Évora, among others.

In 2014, Robinson joins the cast of the telenovela Yo no creo en los hombres starring Adriana Louvier and Gabriel Soto. For her interpretation of the personage of Josefa, the actress obtains the Premio TVyNovelas in the category of Better antagonistic actress.

In 2016, she acted in the telenovela Vino el amor.

In 2020, Robinson debuted as a director in the telenovela ¿Qué le pasa a mi familia? produced by Juan Osorio.

Theatre
Azela Robinson has participated in theatrical assemblies in Mexico. Of them they emphasise Todos a la piscina (1991), Trilogía amorosa (1993), the classic Who's Afraid of Virginia Woolf? (1995), with Rogelio Guerra and Juan Ignacio Aranda, directed by Enrique Rentería; La casa de Bernarda Alba (2002), by Federico García Lorca, along with the actresses Ofelia Guilmáin, Maria Rubio and Aurora Molina; Hombres (2005), with Patricia Reyes Spíndola, María Rojo and others; Orinoco (2007), directed by Benjamín Cann, along Cynthia Klitbo; El acrobata (2008), directed by Roberto D'Amico and next to Ricardo Fastlicht; Macbeth (2008), directed by Leonardo Ayala, with Mónica Dionne; Doce mujeres en pugna (2009), produced by Jorge Ortiz de Pinedo, along with Yolanda Mérida, Laura Zapata, Leticia Calderón and others; La ronda de las harpías (2009), with Ofelia Medina, Victoria Ruffo and Magda Guzmán; Tu tampoco eres normal (2011), directed by Humberto Zurita, next to Alexis Ayala; Baño de mujeres (2013), under the direction of Roberto D'Amico, with Sylvia Pasquel, Ofelia Medina and others, and Made in Mexico (2015), with Juan Ferrara, Rafael Inclán and Socorro Bonilla."Los negros pájaros del adiós" (2016) "Entre mujeres"2019 ((Edith Gozalez)) ((Ana Bertha Espín))

Filmography

Awards and nominations

Premios TV y Novelas

References

External links

 Azela Robinson en alma latina
 Azela Robinson en Biosstars

Living people
1965 births
20th-century English women
21st-century English women
20th-century Mexican actresses
21st-century Mexican actresses
Actresses from London
Actresses of Mexican descent
Alumni of Bristol Old Vic Theatre School
British actors of Latin American descent
English emigrants to Mexico
English people of Mexican descent
Mexican film actresses
Mexican stage actresses
Mexican telenovela actresses
Mexican television actresses
Naturalized citizens of Mexico
Mexican people of English descent